Aap Aye Bahar Ayee is a 1971 Bollywood film produced, directed and written by Mohan Kumar. It stars Rajendra Kumar, Sadhana Shivdasani, Rajendranath and Prem Chopra. The film was highly successful with the music, by Laxmikant Pyarelal. However, the film flopped at the box office due to its unconventional plot.

Plot
Rohit (Rajendra Kumar), Whiskey (Rajendra Nath), and Kumar (Prem Chopra) are childhood friends. While travelling to his estate in the company of Whiskey, Rohit meets with the beautiful Neena and falls in love with her. Subsequently, he meets with her father where they are properly introduced, and she too falls in love with him. Unknowingly, Kumar also sends his proposal for marriage to Neena, who having no interest, tears up his photo before even seeing it. Hearing that, Kumar is offended. He plans to take revenge and, shortly before the marriage of Neena and Rohit, just when the marriage is officially fixed, in the same night, Neena unknowingly surrenders to Kumar, presuming that he is Rohit. After Neena is molested, Rohit and Kumar become enemies, have a fight and Kumar loses sight in his left eye. Feeling that she is not worthy of Rohit anymore, Neena refuses to marry him. Her father has a fatal heart attack when he learns the truth. Neena catches a train and tries to leave, but falls unconscious inside. Rohit sees that and rescues her.

Neena discovers that she is pregnant with Kumar's baby and tries kill herself. Rohit stops her from doing so and marries her in a nearby Shiv Mandir. Kumar also learns about the baby, and goes to Rohit's house to discuss it, but meets an angry response. While he and Rohit are having an argument, Rohit says that the child is not his. Kumar secretly records this information. Rohit brings up the child as his own son who is adored by all. Many years later, Kumar, now an infamous international criminal, shows up at Rohit's son's birthday party, demanding money from Rohit by blackmailing him with the same tape he used to record Rohit's confession years ago. Having no other choice, Rohit agrees. The next day Kumar arrives for the money, takes it but is confronted by Neena on his way out who threatens to kill him with a pistol. He quickly kidnaps Rohit's son and flees; Rohit goes after him. After a long and gruelling fight, Kumar throws Rohit's son into the water. Rohit, badly injured, dives to save him, and then Neena fatally shoots Kumar with one of his own henchmen's guns. With Kumar gone from their lives, Rohit, Neena and their son (who is actually Kumar's biological son) live happily ever after.

Songs

Aap Aye Bahar Ayee was a hit song. The music for the film was composed by Laxmikant Pyarelal and the lyrics, by Anand Bakshi.
 "Mujhe Teri Mohabbat Ka Sahara" – Mohammed Rafi, Lata Mangeshkar
 "Poochhe Jo Koi Mujhse" – Mohd. Rafi 
 "Aap Aye Bahaar Ayee" – Mohd. Rafi  
 "Tare Kitne Neel Gagan Pe Tare" – Mohd. Rafi, Hemlata
 "Tumko Bhi To Aisa Kuchh Hota" – Lata Mangeshkar, Kishore Kumar
 "Koyel Kyon Gaaye" – Mohd. Rafi, Lata Mangeshkar

Cast
 Rajendra Kumar as Rohit Kumar Verma
 Sadhana as Neena Bakshi / Neena Verma
 Prem Chopra as Kumar
 Rajendra Nath as Whiskey
 Bobby
 Raj Mehra as Bakshi (Neena's dad)
 Mumtaz Begum (actress) as Mrs. Verma, Rohit's mom
 Meena T as Rasilee
 Kamaldeep as Manager
 Madhu Apte
 June
 Subhash (as Subhash)
 Sarita Devi
 Kodi S. Irani (as Khodu Baba)
 Surendra (as Surinder)
 Prem Kumar
 Lamba
 Raj Kumar
 Shaikh
 Uma Khosla
 Master Rohit

External links 
 

1971 films
1970s Hindi-language films
Films scored by Laxmikant–Pyarelal
Films directed by Mohan Kumar